The Edinburg WPA Auditorium is a historic auditorium building at 67 Main Street in Edinburg, North Dakota.  The Art Deco structure was built in 1938 as part of the Works Progress Administration jobs program.  It is a wood-frame building two stories high, sheathed in boards to which a stucco finish has been applied.  There is a central projecting section on the front facade.  The upper level is a large open space which was usable for a variety of social and recreational activities, and features a well-preserved sprung wooden basketball surface, decorated with the names and logos of area high school basketball teams.  The lower level was originally a utility space.  The upper part of the building was originally accessed via external stairs, but these were removed in 1990, and the building's entrance was reconfigured to have split-level stairs providing access to both upper and lower levels.

The building was used as a local social center through the middle decades of the 20th century, with rollerskating being a popular pastime, and is now occupied by a hardware store.  It was listed on the National Register of Historic Places in 2013.

References

Art Deco architecture in North Dakota
Commercial buildings completed in 1938
Event venues on the National Register of Historic Places in North Dakota
National Register of Historic Places in Walsh County, North Dakota
Works Progress Administration in North Dakota
1938 establishments in North Dakota